Stoakley is an unincorporated community located in Calvert County, Maryland, United States. It is generally considered part of Prince Frederick and utilizes the Prince Frederick zip code.

Unincorporated communities in Calvert County, Maryland
Unincorporated communities in Maryland